The Pampulha Art Museum, formerly known as Cassino da Pampulha, is a building that is part of the Pampulha Modern Ensemble located in Belo Horizonte, Minas Gerais, Brazil. The building was designed by the architect Oscar Niemeyer at the request of the then-mayor of the city, Juscelino Kubitschek, and is recognized by UNESCO as a World Heritage Site along with the rest of the ensemble since 2016.

Construction 
It is one of the buildings designed by the architect Oscar Niemeyer, with structural calculation by the engineer Joaquim Cardoso, around the Lake Pampulha, in the Jardim Atlântico neighborhood in Belo Horizonte, Minas Gerais, Brazil, at the request of the then-mayor Juscelino Kubitschek in the early 1940s. The building is part of the Pampulha Modern Ensemble, which also includes the Church of Saint Francis of Assisi, the Casa do Baile, and the Iate Tênis Clube.

It was the first building of the complex to be built.

As soon as it was inaugurated, the city's first casino began to attract players from all over Brazil, transforming the nightlife of Belo Horizonte. As the person in charge of the house was Joaquim Rolla, the same administrator of the casino in Urca, in Rio de Janeiro, and of the casino in the Quitandinha Palace, in Petrópolis, the casino brought some of the greatest international music show attractions to Belo Horizonte.

Burle Marx designed the external gardens, which are decorated with three sculptures (by Ceschiatti, Zamoyski and José Pedrosa). Since the renovation in 1996, its facilities have included a library, souvenir shop, café, and multimedia rooms.

Conversion to museum 
The glory days of Pampulha Casino were short-lived. On April 30, 1946, during the government of General Gaspar Dutra, gambling was prohibited throughout Brazil. The conversion of the casino into an art museum was proposed by the architects from Minas Gerais, Sylvio de Vasconcellos, who became its first director, and Celso Pinheiro, who was its chief conservator until 1965. The conversion was completed in 1957, when it was known as the "Crystal Palace".

Collection 
The MAP has a collection of 1,400 works, including exhibitions of Brazilian contemporary art, which focus on various artistic trends. One of the highlights of the collection are the works by Guignard. Its collection brings together works by various plastic artists such as Oswaldo Goeldi, Fayga Ostrower, and Anna Letycia, works by modernists such as Di Cavalcanti, Livio Abramo, Bruno Giorgi, and Ceschiatti, and by contemporary artists such as Antonio Dias, Frans Krajcberg, Ado Malagoli, Iberê Camargo, Tomie Ohtake, Ivan Serpa, Milton Dacosta, Alfredo Volpi, Franz Weissmann, among others.

In seven decades of operation, the museum has never undergone major renovations, even with infiltration problems that date back to the breaking of the Pampulha dam in 1955. In 2016, the Municipal Foundation of Culture announced that in July, the MAP would be closed to begin a major renovation throughout the building, lasting two years and costing R$4.2 million.

References 

Oscar Niemeyer buildings
Tourist attractions in Belo Horizonte
Casinos in Brazil